This is a list of notable child actors from the Philippines. These actors are aged 17 and under. When they turn 18, they legally become adults and are no longer listed as child actors but will be moved to the list of former child actors from the Philippines.

M

N

O

Y

Notes
For estimating the age at the time of shooting, note that above the years of release are given.
If a person doesn't have an article on Wikipedia please make a reference to a reliable source.

Filipino, current
 List
 List
 List
current child actors
Filipino current child actors

nl:Lijst van kindsterren